The Camp d’Esports d’Aixovall, officially named DEVK-Arena due to an sponsorship arrangement, was a former football stadium in Aixovall, in the parish Sant Julià de Lòria, near the capital, Andorra la Vella, in Andorra. The stadium had a capacity of 1,000  spectators, all seated.

The Camp d’Esports d’Aixovall and the Estadi Comunal d'Andorra la Vella together hosted all of the games of Andorra's two highest football competitions, the Lliga de Primera Divisió and the Lliga de Segona Divisió.

References

External links
Photos from Camp d'Aixovall

Sant Julià de Lòria
Football venues in Andorra
FC Santa Coloma
UE Santa Coloma
FC Rànger's
FC Encamp